Sex: The Revolution was a four-part 2008 American documentary miniseries that aired on VH1 and The Sundance Channel. It chronicled the rise of American interest in sexuality from the 1950s through the 1990s.

The version shown on VH1 was pixelated to censor nudity including in discussions of censorship of nudity. VH1 Latin America aired the uncensored version.

Episodes
"Save It 'Til Marriage:" first aired Monday, May 12, 2008, focused on sexual repression of the 1950s

"The Big Bang:" first aired Tuesday, May 13, 2008, the sexual explosion of the 1960s

"Do Your Thing:" first aired Wednesday, May 14, 2008, the sexual independence of the 1970s

"Tainted Love:" first aired Thursday, May 15, 2008, the tail end of the revolution during the late 1970s and early 1980s. And the beginning of AIDS.

Key topics
The Kinsey Report
Playboy
Rock and Roll
Citizens for Decent Literature
The Pill
Sex and the Single Girl
Playboy Clubs
the Generation Gap
Beatniks
Free Speech vs. Filthy Speech
Sexual Freedom League
Hippies and the Summer of Love
Protest culture
Civil Rights Movement
the Vietnam War
Abbie Hoffman
the Abortion debate
the Strip Club
Sex as marketing tool
Sexploitation
the new Film Code
Sex on Broadway (Oh! Calcutta!)
Masters and Johnson
Human sexual response cycle
Human Sexual Inadequacy
Swingers
Urban Swingers
Esalen Institute
Encounter groups
Bob & Carol & Ted & Alice
New attitudes towards sexuality in the middle class
Linda LeClair and Barnard College
Women's Equality
Bra burning
Efforts against the Sexual Revolution
Midnight Cowboy
Woodstock
Feminism and Gay Liberation
Stonewall Riots
 The removal of Homosexuality from the list of mental illnesses
Fire Island
Fear of Flying
Roe v. Wade
Sandstone Retreat
Wide-release pornography
Porno Chic
Deep Throat
Behind the Green Door
Marilyn Chambers
the Castro District and the rise of Gay Villages in many major cities.
Harvey Milk
Assassination of Milk and George Moscone
the Castro Riots
Anita Bryant vs. Homosexuality
Anti-feminist Movement
Disco
Studio 54
Plato's Retreat
Cocaine and Quaaludes
The Village People
Gay bathhouses
the modern pornographic magazine
Full-frontal nudity
Hustler Magazine
Penthouse Magazine
"showing pink"
Anti-pornography campaign
The Rolling Stones "Black and Blue Billboard"
Rise in Divorce Rates
Kramer vs. Kramer
The Backlash
Dressed to Kill
Cruising
Looking for Mr. Goodbar
The rise of the Religious Right
The US presidential election of Ronald Reagan 
VD and STDs
Genital herpes
AIDS
"the gay disease"
The death of Rock Hudson
the Meese Commission
"I know it when I see it"
Fatal Attraction
the notion of safe sex
Repercussions and positive changes as a result of the revolution in the new century.
Internet Pornography
Reality Television
Sexual imagery in the media.
Increased acceptance and visibility of gays and lesbians
Sexual harassment in the work place.
Increased awareness and concern over domestic violence.
Change in gender roles in society.

2008 American television series debuts
2008 American television series endings
Sexuality and society
American documentary television series about sex